The San Rafael Improvement Club, at 1800 5th Ave. in San Rafael, California, was built in 1915.  It was listed on the National Register of Historic Places in 1984.

It was built in 1915 as a pavilion for the Panama–Pacific International Exposition in San Francisco, and was relocated and reassembled in 1916 in the City of San Rafael to be used as a permanent clubhouse building the San Rafael Improvement Club, a civic organization founded in 1902.

The organization may or may not have defined itself as a women's club, but photos show that is what it was.

It served as the Victrola Pavilion, for the Victrola company, inside the Liberal Arts Palace.

It was designed by William B. Faville in Classical Revival style. When it was reassembled, a roof was added.

It was eventually sold by the club.  It was unused from 1997 to at least 2018.

The only other building surviving from the 1915 exposition is the San Francisco Palace of Fine Arts.

References

Women's club buildings in California
National Register of Historic Places in Marin County, California
Neoclassical architecture in California
Buildings and structures completed in 1916
History of women in California